Lee Sang-su (born 13 August 1990) is a South Korean table tennis player. He won two singles titles at the ITTF Pro Tour, the first one was in 2010. He reached semifinals in singles event at the 2017 World Championships.

Lee Sangsu represented South Korea at the 2020 Tokyo Olympics in the men's team event after winning the Olympic trials held in February 2021.

Singles titles

References

1990 births
Living people
South Korean male table tennis players
Table tennis players at the 2016 Summer Olympics
Olympic table tennis players of South Korea
Universiade medalists in table tennis
World Table Tennis Championships medalists
Table tennis players at the 2018 Asian Games
Asian Games medalists in table tennis
Asian Games silver medalists for South Korea
Asian Games bronze medalists for South Korea
Medalists at the 2018 Asian Games
Universiade bronze medalists for South Korea
Expatriate table tennis people in Japan
Medalists at the 2015 Summer Universiade
Table tennis players at the 2020 Summer Olympics